Alsenz is a municipality in the Donnersbergkreis district, in Rhineland-Palatinate, Germany. Alsenz has an area of 12.88 km2 and a population of 1,647 (as of December 31, 2020).

Culture and sights 
In the centre of the village is the Renaissance village hall (Rathaus), built in 1578. The building consists of a bricked lower storey with round arches and timber-framed upper storey.

The Palatine Stonemason Museum, (Pfälzische Steinhauermuseum) the Museum of Local History  (Museum für Heimatgeschichte) and the North Palatinate Gallery (Nordpfalzgalerie) also use rooms in the village hall. The Nassau-Weilburg district headquarters (Amtshof), built around 1780, the 1756 former synagogue and the 18th century Protestant church characterise the village scene.

Notable residents

 Wilhelm Frick (1877-1946), Nazi official, executed for war crimes

References

Municipalities in Rhineland-Palatinate
Donnersbergkreis
Palatinate (region)